James Rosati (1911 in Washington, Pennsylvania 1911 – 1988 in New York City) was an American abstract sculptor. He is best known for creating an outdoor sculpture in New York: a  stainless steel Ideogram.

Life
Born near Pittsburgh, Rosati moved to New York in 1944, where he befriended fellow sculptor Phillip Pavia. He was a charter member of the Eighth Street Club (the Club) and the New York School of abstract expressionists.  Rosati was among the participants in the 9th Street Art Exhibition and the subsequent Stable Gallery shows.  He met and became friends with painters Willem de Kooning and Franz Kline, and sculptor David Smith.  He was awarded the Mr and Mrs Frank G. Logan Art Institute Prize for sculpture in 1962 and a John Simon Guggenheim Fellowship in 1964.  A 1969 show at Brandeis University lifted his career to new heights.  He had other solo exhibitions and was in numerous group shows.

Rosati created many monumental pieces of sculpture which are located in the United States and around the world.

After his death in 1988, he was interred at Immaculate Conception Cemetery in Washington, Pennsylvania.

Public collections
Public collections holding work by James Rosati include:
Albright-Knox Art Gallery (Buffalo, New York)
 Carnegie Museum of Art (Pittsburgh, Pennsylvania)
 Governor Nelson A. Rockefeller Empire State Plaza Art Collection (Albany, New York)
 Grounds for Sculpture (Hamilton, New Jersey)
 Honolulu Museum of Art (Honolulu, Hawaii)
 Museo della Scultural Contemporanea - Matera (Matera, Italy)
 National Gallery of Art (Washington, D. C.)
 Whitney Museum of American Art (New York City)
 Yale University Art Gallery (New Haven, Connecticut)

Selected works
 Column I, Stanford University
 Loo Wit, Seattle University
 Upright Form V, 1982, Montgomery Museum of Fine Arts, Blount Cultural Park, Montgomery, Alabama

References

Sources
Marika Herskovic, American Abstract and Figurative Expressionism: Style Is Timely Art Is Timeless (New York School Press, 2009.) . p. 204-207
 Marika Herskovic, New York School Abstract Expressionists Artists Choice by Artists, (New York School Press, 2000.) . p. 16; p. 25; p. 38; p. 314-317

External links
 James Rosati - American Artist (1911-1988)

1911 births
1988 deaths
20th-century American sculptors
20th-century American male artists
Abstract expressionist artists
American male sculptors
American people of Italian descent
Artists from New York City
Artists from Pittsburgh
Modern sculptors
Sculptors from New York (state)
Sculptors from Pennsylvania